Salve Jorge (Literally: Hail George,) is a Brazilian primetime telenovela created by Glória Perez and directed by Marcos Schechtman.

It premiered on 22 October 2012 replacing Avenida Brasil and ended on 17 May 2013 on TV Globo at the 9 p.m. timeslot, and being followed by Amor à Vida.

A total of 179 episodes of 55 minutes (35 minutes on Wednesdays due to the 2012–2013 Football season broadcast) were produced and aired Mondays to Saturdays. However, when syndicated and sold to other countries the telenovela got the number of episodes reduced to 140 and the duration fixed at 45 minutes.

Starring Nanda Costa, Giovanna Antonelli, Carolina Dieckmann, Rodrigo Lombardi, Cláudia Raia, Flávia Alessandra, Alexandre Nero, Cléo Pires and Domingos Montagner.

Plot
In Istanbul, Turkey, 18-year-old Morena (Nanda Costa) is auctioned by a group of wealthy and successful men. She ended up being sold for a U$3.500 bid. The next scene shows Morena running desperately through the streets, screaming for help. The scene flashes back to eight months earlier.

Morena is a single-mother who lives with her four-year-old son Junior (Luiz Felipe Mello) and her mom Lucimar (Dira Paes) helps her to support him. Though unemployed, she manages to garner strength and resolve in order to forge her own path.

Following the 2010 occupation of the Complexo do Alemão by the Brazilian Army, Morena meets Theo (Rodrigo Lombardi), a cavalry officer who is charmed by her spontaneity and sensuality. They fall in love, unaware that love does not conquer all.

Motivated by the prospect of a better future and facing eviction, Morena accepts a job offer to work in a coffeehouse in Istanbul for a few months. Her decision, however, not only ends her engagement to Theo, who disapproves of her trip, but leads to her being a victim of an international human trafficking ring.

Cunning Wanda (Totia Meirelles), who offered Morena what turns out to be a fictitious job, works with Livia Marini (Cláudia Raia), a sophisticated, intelligent and seemingly irreproachable woman. The truth, however, tells a different story: although she claims to be a world-renowned talent agent, Livia is in fact head of an international human trafficking organization which generates billions of dollars every year.

Upon arriving in Turkey, Morena is forced to work at a dreary nightclub where Russo (Adriano Garib), head of security and member of the ring, constantly intimidates young women by threatening to harm their families in Brazil.

Despite being held captive, Morena refuses to accept her fate and decides to fight against the crime that victimized her. Together with her ill-fated companions, she counts on the help of Police Chief Heloísa (Giovanna Antonelli) to take down the ring's villainous scheme. On top of such difficulties, Morena also has to deal with another challenging mission: to regain Theo's love and trust. Theo still loves her but has since entered into a new romantic relationship and is determined to forget her. In the end Morena with the help of Mrs Heloisa will expose the traffic gangs then Morena and Theo will live happily.

Cast

Impact

Ratings 

The first episode of Salve Jorge recorded a viewership rating of 36 points, peaking at 40 points with 60% share. Its predecessors Avenida Brasil and Fina Estampa, recorded 37:points with a 63% and 41 points respectively. The second episode registered 37 points in Greater São Paulo. Its first week it recorded a cumulative indices of 33 points.

On 28 January 2013, the show registered 39 points with a 64% audience share.

By episode 90, Salve Jorge had an average of 30.8 points, lower than the predecessor. For instance Avenida Brasil and Fina Estampa 37.7 and 38.8 respectively.

According to accumulated data by Ibope, its last episode that aired on 17 May 2013 registered 46 points with 76% audience share.

Accumulately it registered 33 points.

Awards and nominations

Notes

References

External links 
 

2012 Brazilian television series debuts
2013 Brazilian television series endings
2012 telenovelas
TV Globo telenovelas
Brazilian telenovelas
Brazilian LGBT-related television shows
Transgender-related television shows
Television shows set in Rio de Janeiro (city)
Television shows set in Turkey
Telenovelas by Glória Perez
Portuguese-language telenovelas
Human trafficking in fiction